Xanthodesma is a genus of moths of the family Erebidae. The genus was erected by Per Olof Christopher Aurivillius in 1910.

Species
Species of this genus are:
Xanthodesma aurantiaca Aurivillius, 1910
Xanthodesma aurata Aurivillius, 1910
Xanthodesma rectangulata Kenrick, 1917

References
Aurivillius (1910). "Lepidoptera". In: Sjöstedt (ed.) Wissenschaftliche Ergebnisse der schwedischen zoologischen Expedition nach dem Kilimandjaro, dem Meru und den umgebenen Massaisteppen Deutsch-Ostafrikas 1905–06. Part 9. :1–56, pls. 1–2. 

Calpinae